Paula S. Fass (born May 22, 1947) is an American historian and the Margaret Byrne Professor of History (Emerita) at the University of California, Berkeley. A social and cultural historian, Fass has published numerous books on the history of childhood and youth in the United States, and served as president of the Society for the History of Children and Youth from 2007 to 2009.

Biography
Fass was born on May 22, 1947, and educated at Columbia University.

Publications

 The End of American Childhood: A History of Parenting from Life on the Frontier to the Managed Child. Princeton University Press, 2016
The Routledge History of Childhood in the Western World (Editor). Routledge, 2013.
Reinventing Childhood After World War II (co-edited with Michael Grossberg).  University of Pennsylvania Press, 2011.
Children of a New World: Society, Culture, and Globalization. New York University Press, 2007.
Encyclopedia of Children and Childhood in History and Society (Editor-in-Chief). Macmillan Reference, 2004.
Childhood in America (co-edited with Mary Ann Mason). New York University Press, 2000. 
Kidnapped: Child Abduction in America. Oxford University Press, 1997.
Outside In: Minorities and the Transformation of American Education. Oxford University Press, 1989.
The Damned and the Beautiful: American Youth in the 1920s. Oxford University Press, 1977.

References

1947 births
American historians of education
Barnard College alumni
Columbia University alumni
Living people
University of California, Berkeley College of Letters and Science faculty
Historians from California